This is a list of public aquariums in Australia. For zoos in Australia, see List of zoos in Australia.

Aquariums are facilities where animals are confined within tanks and displayed to the public, and in which they may also be bred. Such facilities include public aquariums, oceanariums, marine mammal parks, and dolphinariums.

Australian Capital Territory
 National Zoo & Aquarium – Canberra

New South Wales
 Irukandji Shark & Ray Encounters – Port Stephens
 Merimbula Aquarium – Merimbula
 Sydney Aquarium – Sydney

Queensland
 Aquasearch Aquarium – Nelly Bay, Magnetic Island
 Cairns Aquarium
 Reef World – Hervey Bay
 Reef HQ – Townsville
 Sea World – Gold Coast
 Undersea World – Cairns
 UnderWater World – Mooloolaba

South Australia
 Kangaroo Island Penguin Centre (formerly Kangaroo Island Marine Centre) – Kingscote

Tasmania
 Bicheno Sealife Centre – Bicheno
Seahorse World – Beauty Point

Victoria
 Melbourne Aquarium – Melbourne

Western Australia
 Aquarium of Western Australia – Perth
 Ocean Park Aquarium – Denham, Shark Bay

See also
List of aquaria

References

Aquaria in Australia
Australia
Aquaria
Aquaria